The 2022–23 Tunisian Women's Championship is the 17th season of the Tunisian Women's Championship, the Tunisian national women's association football competition. AS Banque de l'Habitat are the defending champions.

Clubs

North Group
 AS Banque de l'Habitat
 ASF Bou Hajla
 ASF Sousse
 AvS Jrissa
 US Tunisienne
 ASF Manzel bourgiba
ASF Sahel(w)

South Group
 ASF Gafsa
 ASF El Gutar
 ASF Medenine
 MS Sidi Bouzid
 ASF Sbeitla
 PSF Sfax
  ASF Sbeitla

Group stage

Group A

Results

Group B

Results

References

External links
Women football - FTF official website

Tunisian Women's Championship